Pablo Martínez may refer to:

 Pablo Martínez (actor) (born 1987), Argentine actor
 Pablo Martínez (shortstop) (born 1969), Dominican baseball player
 Pablo Martínez (canoeist)
 Pablo Martinez (French footballer) (born 1989), defender for Racing Club de Strasbourg Alsace
 Pablo Martínez (pitcher) (1898–?), Cuban baseball player
 Pablo Martínez (Paraguayan footballer) (born 1996), forward for Club Atlético Lanús
 Pablo Martínez (Spanish footballer) (born 1998), midfielder for UD San Sebastián de los Reyes
 Pablo Martínez (Uruguayan footballer) (born 1989), midfielder for Club Sportivo Cerrito
 Pablo Martinez (Welsh footballer) (born 2000), English-Welsh footballer